State Route 26 (SR 26) is a  state highway in Russell County in the southeastern part of the U.S. state of Alabama.

Route description

SR 26 assumes an east–west orientation for the duration of its length. It is routed along a two-lane roadway for its duration, passing through rural farmlands in western and central Russell County. Southwest of its terminating intersection with SR 51, the roadway continues towards Union Springs in Bullock County

Major intersections

See also

References

External links

026
Transportation in Russell County, Alabama